Kavir National Park is a protected ecological zone in northern Iran. It has an area of 4,000 square kilometers (1,500 mile²). The park is located 120 kilometers south of Tehran and 100 kilometers east of Qom, and it sits on the western end of one of Iran's two major deserts, the Dasht-e Kavir (Great Salt Desert). Siahkuh (Black Mountain), a large, semi-circular rock outcropping sits in roughly the park's center.

The park encompasses landscapes of desert and steppes, and is sometimes known as "Little Africa" for its safari-like wildlife, including native goats (Capra aegagrus), sheep (Ovis orientalis), striped hyenas, Indian wolves, gazelles, the rare Asiatic cheetahs, and the Persian leopards. Typically, the area receives around 150 millimeters (6 inches) of rain a year, most of which falls between November and May. The vegetation in the region is adapted to drought and salty soils. To retain water and combat grazing by animals some plants grow leaves with thorns, much like thorn trees and bushes found in Africa desert landscapes.

Namak Lake (Salt Lake) sits immediately outside the park boundaries. This is actually a salt marsh, and water flows into the lake from the north via the Qom River, which also flows through the northern part of Kavir National Park. The Qom is one of the very few permanent rivers through the entire desert expanse in Iran. 
The Kavir National Park lies in the central province of Semnan and spans an area of 440,000 hectares.

Environment

Local authorities consider insufficient labor force, excessive use of land to graze cattle and illegal hunting as the main problems the park is faced with. Despite the vastness of the park, only 30 rangers work there under the most difficult conditions and for minimum wage. A more detailed look, however, reveals that there are graver problems than those mentioned by the authorities:

The major oil projects currently being implemented in the park are believed will eventually turn the area into a salt land. The area is frequently used for military maneuvers.

The park is sometimes host to car racing competitions, which, together with the military maneuvers, have led many unique animal species, such as the Persian zebras and the Asian cheetahs to flee the area as they do not feel secure anymore.

References

External links

National parks of Iran
Biosphere reserves of Iran
Deserts of Iran
Geography of Semnan Province